The Jazz Professors is a sextet of American  jazz musicians who are all both working music professionals in their own right and faculty members of the Jazz Studies program at the University of Central Florida in Orlando, Florida.  They release albums annually on the Flying Horse Records label, a professional label within the school.  Their first two albums both made the JazzWeek charts, with The Jazz Professors: Live at the UCF-Orlando Jazz Festival  topping out at No. 19 in 2012, and their second album, Do That Again (Flying Horse) (2013) charting as high as No. 6 nationally

The group performs with guest artists and orchestras, most notably Kenny Drew Jr. and Michael Philip Mossman.

Roster

 Jeff Rupert, tenor/alto saxophone
 Per Danielsson, piano
 Bobby Koelble, guitar
 Richard Drexler, bass
 Marty Morell, drums

Former Members

 Michael Wilkinson, trombone

Discography
 En Plein Air (album) – (Flying Horse), 2015
 Do That Again – (Flying Horse), 2013
 The Jazz Professors: Live at the UCF-Orlando Jazz Festival (Flying Horse), 2012

Website

Flying Horse https://flyinghorserecords.com/

References

21st century in jazz
American jazz ensembles from Florida
University of Central Florida faculty
2012 establishments in Florida
Musical groups established in 2012